Propliopithecus is an extinct genus of primate.

The 40 cm (1 ft 4 in) long creature resembled today's gibbons. Its eyes faced forwards, giving it stereoscopical vision. Propliopithecus was most likely an omnivore. It is possible that Propliopithecus is the same creature as Aegyptopithecus. If that would be the case the name Propliopithecus would take precedence over Aegyptopithecus according to ICZN rules, because it was coined earlier.

Human-like dental features
Propliopithecus had small canine teeth, lacked spaces to fit the canine teeth of the other jaw into, and had molars very similar to those of Australopithecus. These features set  Propliopithecus apart from Aegyptopithecus, which had big canine teeth along with other more normal simian dental features.

References

Oligocene primates
Prehistoric apes
Fossil taxa described in 1910
Prehistoric primate genera
Oligocene mammals of Africa